KNLV (1060 AM, branded as "Greatest Hits 93.9 & 1060") is a radio station licensed to serve Ord, Nebraska, broadcasting an oldies music format featuring the top-40 hits from the 1960s through 1990s. The Mighty 1060 also features farm reports, local news, weather and local high school sports play-by-play broadcasts. It operates on AM frequency 1060 kHz and is under ownership of MWB Broadcasting II.

An FM translator for KNLV is known as Greatest Hits 93.9 FM.

Previous logo

References

External links

NLV
Oldies radio stations in the United States
Radio stations established in 1965